The Commonwealth of Nations dates back to the first half of the 20th century with the decolonization of the British Empire through increased self-governance of its territories. It was originally created as the British Commonwealth of Nations through the Balfour Declaration at the 1926 Imperial Conference, and was formalized by the United Kingdom through the Statute of Westminster in 1931. Though the current Commonwealth of Nations was formally constituted by the London Declaration in 1949, the Statute of Westminster in 1931 is most often used as dividing point between the British Empire and The Commonwealth.

Tallest structures
This includes antenna masts, spires, and architectural details.

Former tallest structures
This includes antenna masts, spires, and architectural details.

Timeline of tallest structures
This list ranks structures that were the tallest in the Commonwealth of Nations, measured from the base to the tallest structural point. This includes antenna masts, spires, and architectural details. Since 1973, Canada has been home to the tallest structure in the Commonwealth.

References

Commonwealth
Commonwealth
Tallest structures